Rychnov nad Kněžnou District is a district in the Hradec Králové Region of the Czech Republic. Its capital is the town of Rychnov nad Kněžnou.

Administrative division
Rychnov nad Kněžnou District is divided into three administrative districts of municipalities with extended competence: Rychnov nad Kněžnou, Dobruška and Kostelec nad Orlicí.

List of municipalities
Towns are marked in bold and market towns in italics:

Albrechtice nad Orlicí - 
Bačetín - 
Bartošovice v Orlických horách - 
Bílý Újezd - 
Bohdašín - 
Bolehošť - 
Borohrádek - 
Borovnice - 
Bystré - 
Byzhradec - 
Častolovice - 
Čermná nad Orlicí - 
Černíkovice - 
České Meziříčí - 
Čestice - 
Chleny - 
Chlístov - 
Deštné v Orlických horách - 
Dobřany - 
Dobré - 
Dobruška - 
Doudleby nad Orlicí - 
Hřibiny-Ledská - 
Jahodov - 
Janov - 
Javornice - 
Kostelec nad Orlicí - 
Kostelecké Horky - 
Kounov - 
Králova Lhota -  
Krchleby - 
Kvasiny - 
Lhoty u Potštejna - 
Libel - 
Liberk - 
Lično - 
Lípa nad Orlicí - 
Lukavice - 
Lupenice - 
Mokré - 
Nová Ves - 
Očelice - 
Ohnišov - 
Olešnice - 
Olešnice v Orlických horách - 
Opočno - 
Orlické Záhoří - 
Osečnice - 
Pěčín - 
Podbřezí - 
Pohoří - 
Polom - 
Potštejn - 
Přepychy - 
Proruby - 
Říčky v Orlických horách - 
Rohenice - 
Rokytnice v Orlických horách - 
Rybná nad Zdobnicí -
Rychnov nad Kněžnou -
Sedloňov - 
Semechnice - 
Skuhrov nad Bělou - 
Slatina nad Zdobnicí - 
Sněžné - 
Solnice - 
Svídnice - 
Synkov-Slemeno - 
Třebešov - 
Trnov - 
Tutleky - 
Týniště nad Orlicí - 
Val - 
Vamberk - 
Voděrady - 
Vrbice - 
Záměl - 
Žďár nad Orlicí
Zdelov - 
Zdobnice

Geography

Rychnov nad Kněžnou District borders Poland in the east. The terrain is very varied, in the east it is mountainous and towards the west it becomes foothills and then flat. The territory extends into four geomorphological mesoregions: Orlice Table (west), Podorlická Uplands (centre), Orlické Mountains (east) and Svitavy Uplands (small part in the southwest).

The most significant river is the Divoká Orlice, which forms the Czech-Polish border and then crosses the district in the south. It then connects with the Tichá Orlice within the district to form the Orlice River. Another notable rivers are Bělá and Zdobnice.

Orlické hory is the protected landscape area that covers the eastern part of the district.

Demographics

Most populated municipalities

Economy
The largest employers with its headquarters in Rychnov nad Kněžnou District and at least 500 employers are:

The main employer is the factory of Škoda Auto in Kvasiny with about 9,000 employees.

Transport
There are no motorways passing through the district. The most important roads are the I/11 from Hradec Králové to Šumperk and the I/14 from Náchod to Ústí nad Orlicí.

Sights

The most important monuments in the district, protected as national cultural monuments, are:
Opočno Castle
Church of Saints Peter and Paul in Liberk
Church of Our Lady of Sorrows in Lhoty u Potštejna

The best-preserved settlements, protected as monument zones, are:
Dobruška
Opočno
Rokytnice v Orlických horách
Rychnov nad Kněžnou
Zdobnice-Kačerov

The most visited tourist destination is the Velká Deštná observation tower.

References

External links

Rychnov nad Kněžnou District profile on the Czech Statistical Office's website

 
Districts of the Czech Republic